The Calymmian Period (from , meaning "cover") is the first geologic period in the Mesoproterozoic Era and lasted from  Mya to  Mya (million years ago). Instead of being based on stratigraphy, these dates are defined chronometrically.

The period is characterised by expansion of existing platform covers, or by new platforms on recently cratonized basements.

The supercontinent Columbia started to break during the Calymmian some 1500 Mya.

See also

References

Mesoproterozoic
Geological periods
Proterozoic geochronology